Platerosida howdeni is a species of beetle in the family Cerambycidae, the only species in the genus Platerosida.

References

Lepturinae